The 2008 The All-Japan Rugby Football Championship (日本ラグビーフットボール選手権大会 Nihon Ragubi- Futtobo-ru Senshuken Taikai)

First round consist of the top two University sides from the All Japan University Rugby Championship against the top Club Champion and the Top Challenger Series winner.

Quarter-finals bring in the third and fourth placed Top League teams.

Semi-finals bring in the top two Top League teams who played in the Microsoft Cup. The winners of these games compete in the final.

Qualifying Teams 

 Top League Microsoft Cup Finalists - Suntory Sungoliath, Sanyo Wild Knights
 Top League Third and Fourth - Toshiba Brave Lupus, Toyota Verblitz
 All Japan University Rugby Championship - Keio University RFC, Waseda University
 Japan Rugby Club Champion - Tamariba Club
 Top Challenger Series - Kintetsu Liners

Knockout stages

First round

Quarter-finals

Semi-finals

Final

See also 

 Rugby Union in Japan

External links 

All-Japan Rugby Football Championship
2007–08 in Japanese rugby union
Jap